The Juno Awards of 2019, honouring Canadian music achievements, were presented in London, Ontario during the weekend of 16–17 March 2019. The primary telecast ceremonies were held at Budweiser Gardens, preceded by numerous Juno Week events from 11 March. This was the first time the Juno Awards were hosted in London.

The award ceremony was hosted by Sarah McLachlan.

Shawn Mendes won five awards, the most at the ceremonies, including Artist of the Year, Album of the Year, and Single of the Year.

Host city bids
The Canadian Academy of Recording Arts and Sciences (CARAS) announced on 29 January 2018 that London was selected to host the 2019 Juno Awards. London's bid was valued at $1.7 million, including city council's pledge of $500,000.

CARAS had approached Hamilton, Ontario to make a bid for the 2019 Junos, although that city had expected to bid for the following year's awards. Hamilton city council reserved $550,000 for its bid, valued at $1.5 million.

Saskatoon, which first hosted the Junos in 2007, attempted to host the 2019 awards but withdrew its bid due to a lack of available funding. That bid did not receive support from the province of Saskatchewan. However, the city made a successful bid to host the awards in 2020.

There was also media speculation that Quebec City attempted to bid for the 2019 awards.

Events
The Juno Cup benefit hockey game was held at the Western Fair District Sports Centre on 15 March 2019. The Rockers won the game 7-5.

Alan Doyle of Great Big Sea hosted the Songwriters Circle event on 17 March.

Most categories were awarded at a gala at the London Convention Centre on 16 March, hosted by Ben Kowalewicz (Billy Talent) and Julie Nesrallah (CBC).

The main ceremonies featured Loud Luxury, a duo originally from London. Other performers for the broadcast ceremonies were bülow, Cœur de pirate, Corey Hart, Loud, Jeremy Dutcher with Blake Pouliot, and The Reklaws. The broadcast on CBC's television, radio and music services attracted average minute ratings of 1.2 million. Viewership was 270,000 through streaming and on-demand web access, 14% more than for the 2018 Juno Awards.

JunoFest performances took place in multiple venues across the city on 15 and 16 March. Scheduled performers included Tokyo Police Club, Exco Levi, Texas King, and Whitehorse.

Performers

Presenters

Main show
 Loud Luxury and brando — presented Sarah McLachlan
 Simu Liu (from Kim's Convenience) and Killy (Toronto rapper) — presented Group of the Year
 The Reklaws — presented Album of the Year
 Pablo Rodríguez (Minister of Canadian Heritage) and Elisapie Isaac — presented Breakthrough Artist of the Year
 Sarah McLachlan — presented the Canadian Music Hall of Fame Award to Corey Hart
 Sting and David Foster — presented R&B/Soul Recording of the Year
 Cœur de pirate and Loud — presented Country Album of the Year
 Amanda Parris and Jessie Reyez — presented Fan Choice Award

Nominees and winners
Nominations were announced on 29 January 2019.

David Foster received the year's Humanitarian Award due to his support of numerous charities and for his own foundation that supports families of organ transplant recipients, and Corey Hart was inducted into the Canadian Music Hall of Fame.

Duff Roman, known for his radio career including CHUM-FM, received the Walt Grealis Special Achievement Award.

Shawn Mendes won the Album of the Year, Artist of the Year, Pop Album of the Year, Single of the Year and Songwriter of the Year categories. He was unable to personally receive the awards since he was touring in Europe, but he recorded his song "In My Blood" on 4 March in Amsterdam for the Juno broadcast.

People

Albums

Songs and recordings

Other

References

External links
 "2019 Juno Week Bid" at the City of London

2019
Music festivals in Ontario
Culture of London, Ontario
2019 music awards
2019 in Canadian music
2019 awards in Canada
March 2019 events in Canada
2019 in Ontario